The following is an incomplete list of association football clubs based in Djibouti.
For a complete list see :Category:Football clubs in Djibouti

A
Ali Sabieh
AS Port
AS Tadjourah

C
CDE Colas

D
FC Dikhil

G
Gandaran
Guelleh Batal

H
Hôpital Balbala

K
Kartileh-Al Gamil

S
Sheraton Hôtel

T
Total (football club)

Djibouti
 
Football clubs